The Irish National Stud (official name: Comhlacht Graí Náisiúnta na hÉireann Teo.) is a Thoroughbred horse breeding facility in Tully, Kildare, County Kildare, Ireland. It was formally established by incorporation on 11 April 1946 under the National Stud Act, 1945 and is owned by the Irish Government.

History
The Japanese Gardens at Tully were created between the years 1906–1910. They were devised by Colonel William Hall-Walker (later Lord Wavertree), a wealthy Scotsman of a famous brewery family, and laid out by Japanese craftsman Tassa Eida and his son Minoru. Tassa, his wife and two sons lived at Curragh House, now the Racing Apprentice Centre of Education.  Tassa remained at Tully until 1911 when he and his family moved to London to create another garden. Tassa Eida died in 1912 on his intended return journey to Japan and no more was heard of him or his family until Brian Eida, a son of Minoru, turned up as a tourist in the late 1980s to admire the work of his grandfather Tassa.

The name Minoru, which means 'light of my eye' or the 'favourite one', was chosen by Colonel Hall-Walker for his favourite Tully-bred colt. When leased to King Edward VII for his racing career, the colt Minoru carried the royal colours to victory in the Derby of 1909 to joyous cheers of "Good Old Teddy!"

In 1915, Colonel Hall-Walker departed to England, presenting his entire Tully property to "The Nation." His Stud Farm became the British National Stud and the Japanese Gardens entered a period of relative obscurity until 1945. In that year (Tully properties having returned to the Irish Government in 1943) the Irish National Stud Company was formed. In the following year, 1946, after a gap of 34 years, the Japanese Gardens got a horticultural supervisor.

Attractions

The Stud
Guided tours are available at the visitor centre.

The Japanese Gardens
The Gardens, planned to symbolise the 'Life of Man', are now of international renown and are acclaimed as the finest Japanese Gardens in Europe.

The gardens at Tully are a living monument to the meeting of Eastern and Western cultures in a Western setting. The symbolism of life the garden portrays traces the journey of a soul from Oblivion to Eternity and the human experience of its embodiment as it journeys by paths of its own choice through life. Typical ambitions toward education, marriage, or a contemplative or carefree life, achievement, happy old age and a gateway to Eternity are portrayed. Furthermore, as an example of Japanese Gardening of its period, it is perfect – a Japanese Garden with a hint of Anglicisation about it, was precisely the type of garden being made in Japan at that time.

The journey starts at the gateway from oblivion, through which the pilgrim soul enters among the trees and passes into the open where is a small cavern, the cave of birth, crowned by a cherry tree. Here a short winding sunken path symbolises the years of Childhood, unseeing and unknowing, whence we come to a mound of rock.
Through this the tunnelled pathway leads from the darkness into the light from ignorance to the unfolding knowledge. Half way through the winding is an opening leading to steps to the hill of learning crowded by an ancient fir tree. Often this fir crowned height tempts the student to look too high but there is an unguarded hole to teach him vigilance before he comes down the hill to the level of his fellows.
Following the winding course still guarded by rocks he reaches the parting of the ways. On the right ambition on the left is the straight path of austere living in the centre is the path to wedded life by which the pilgrim reaches the tiny island of joy and wonder, across the stepping stones of exploration. But he cannot stay there.
All paths lead to further temptation across a stone bridge to the bamboo bridge and the geisha house but beyond them is the hill of ambition and the well of wisdom is in sight across the beautiful water.
Very steep is the hill and those who climb may be separated but as they climb they reach out a helping hands and are united at the top. Descending the pilgrim finds an easy bridge across the roaring falls and treads the stepping stones through the level garden of peace and contentment to the hill of mourning where his soul goes forth through the gate of eternity.

St. Fiachra's Garden
To celebrate the Millennium, this garden was opened in 1999 and commemorates the Patron Saint of Gardeners St. Fiachra or Fiacre.

The Horse Museum

The horse museum at the Irish National Stud has on display the skeleton of Arkle the horse.

Governance
All shares in the stud's holding company are vested in the Minister for Finance of Ireland, aside from nominal shareholdings provided to directors.  The directors are appointed by the Minister for Agriculture, including the Chairperson.

Leading breeder Chryss Goulandris, Lady O'Reilly, has been Chairperson since 1998.

See also
 List of Acts of the Oireachtas
 National Stud Act, 1945
 National Stud Act, 1953
 National Stud Act, 1969
 National Stud Act, 1976
 National Stud (Amendment) Act, 1993
 National Stud (Amendment) Act, 2000
 Royal Charger
 The National Stud (England)

References

External links
 Irish National Stud official website

Horse farms in Ireland
Japanese gardens
Tourist attractions in County Kildare
Gardens in County Kildare
Museums in County Kildare
Equestrian museums
Ireland–Japan relations